Ian Turner (born 17 January 1953) is an English former footballer, who won the FA Cup when he played for Southampton as goalkeeper in the 1976 FA Cup Final.

Early career
Ian was one of 10 children and originally played at centre-half for his local team, South Bank. During a match against Huddersfield Reserves he went in goal as a replacement and played so well that he was noticed by Huddersfield Town's manager, Ian Greaves, who signed him as a professional in October 1970.

He transferred to Grimsby Town in March 1972 where he first became acquainted with manager Lawrie McMenemy.

Southampton
In March 1974, Southampton were seeking a replacement for long-time goalkeeper, Eric Martin, so McMenemy, who was by now Southampton's manager, went back to his former club, Grimsby, to sign Ian Turner.

Ian was the first choice keeper for the next few seasons, and in May 1976 was part of the Southampton team who beat Manchester United 1–0 in the FA Cup final. Manchester United started stronger, and missed several early goalscoring opportunities, with Turner making a series of impressive saves to deny Gerry Daly and Gordon Hill.

He was a brave and reliable keeper, but at the start of the 1976–77 season he injured his left knee and required an operation to remove both cartilages. After his return to fitness he only made occasional appearances, including 3 appearances in European games against Olympique Marseille (twice) and Napoli. He started the following season as first-choice 'keeper, but after 8 games he lost his place to Peter Wells in October 1977. He only played 4 further league games that season.

He left Southampton in the summer of 1978 to play for Fort Lauderdale, before working for many of Hampshire's minor teams as a coach.

In his five years at The Dell, he made 107 first team appearances for Southampton.

Other clubs
During his career, he played on loan at various clubs, including Walsall, Newport County, Lincoln City, Luton Town and Halifax Town and spells at various non-league clubs including Witney Town, Salisbury City, Waterlooville and Romsey Town.

After football
After leaving football, he became an engineer in the oil industry and is now living near Stamford in Lincolnshire.

Honours

As a player
Southampton
 FA Cup winner 1976

References

1953 births
Living people
Footballers from Middlesbrough
English footballers
Association football goalkeepers
South Bank F.C. players
Huddersfield Town A.F.C. players
Grimsby Town F.C. players
Walsall F.C. players
Southampton F.C. players
Newport County A.F.C. players
Fort Lauderdale Strikers (1977–1983) players
Lincoln City F.C. players
Luton Town F.C. players
Halifax Town A.F.C. players
Witney Town F.C. players
Salisbury City F.C. players
A.F.C. Totton players
Road-Sea Southampton F.C. players
Waterlooville F.C. players
English Football League players
North American Soccer League (1968–1984) players
English football managers
Romsey Town F.C. managers
Brockenhurst F.C. managers
A.F.C. Totton managers
English expatriate sportspeople in the United States
Expatriate soccer players in the United States
English expatriate footballers
FA Cup Final players